During the early years of World War II before the United States became a formal belligerent, President Franklin D. Roosevelt declared a region of the Atlantic, adjacent to the Americas as the Pan-American Security Zone. Within this zone, United States naval ships escorted convoys bound for Europe. In practice, this greatly aided the United Kingdom, which was largely dependent upon the Atlantic convoys.

The Zone was one of a number of actions taken by the United States that ran counter to its formal state of neutrality. It was set up in October 1939 at US behest by the Declaration of Panama signed by the nations of North and South America.

Despite formal complaints in December 1939 to Britain over the action against the Admiral Graf Spee off the River Plate, US implementation of the Zone was clearly to Britain's advantage. From early 1941, United States Navy convoy escorts eased British and Canadian difficulties by providing escorts; USN ships and aircraft were ordered to broadcast in clear any U-boat sightings, thus alerting British listeners. The Kriegsmarine (German navy) resented this "cheating" but they were instructed to avoid hostile acts against US ships so as not to give cause for a declaration of war.

Original text of the Panama Declaration and associated documents (including map) can be found at the following link: http://digital.library.wisc.edu/1711.dl/FRUS.FRUS1939v05. Original source: United States Department of State, Foreign Relations of the United States diplomatic papers, 1939, volume V, The American Republics, (Washington, DC: Government Printing Office, 1939), pp. 34-39

See also
Neutrality Patrol
Panama Conference (1939)

References

Battle of the Atlantic
American Theater of World War II
Caribbean Sea operations of World War II
1939 establishments in North America
1939 establishments in the United States